Mark Hilton (born ), also known by the nickname of "The Beast", is an English former professional rugby league footballer who played in the 1990s and 2000s.

International honours
Mark Hilton won caps for England while at Warrington in 1995 against France (interchange/substitute), and in 1999 against France (interchange/substitute).

Club career
Mark Hilton made his début for Warrington on Saturday 18 December 1993, and he played his last match for Warrington on Saturday 15 July 2006.

Outside of rugby league
As of 2016, Mark Hilton teaches mathematics at Beamont Collegiate Academy, Warrington, having previously taught at Maghull High School, Merseyside.

References

External links
Statistics at wolvesplayers.thisiswarrington.co.uk

1975 births
Living people
England national rugby league team players
English rugby league players
Schoolteachers from Lancashire
Lancashire rugby league team players
Place of birth missing (living people)
Rugby league props
Warrington Wolves players